This is a list of people and characters with the given name Michael.

People
 Michael of Russia, first tsar of Russia of the House of Romanov
 Michael I of Portugal, King of Portugal
 Michael I of Romania, last King of Romania

A–B
 Michael Adams (journalist) (1920–2005), British journalist
 Michael Adamson (born 1971), Canadian painter
 Michael Mohammed Ahmad, Australian novelist
 Michael Aiken (born 1932), American sociologist and professor
 Michael Aldridge (1920–1994), English actor
 Michael Aldridge (rugby union) (born 1983), Australian rugby union player
 Michael Alfonso (murderer) (born 1969), American former fugitive
 Michael Alig (1966–2020), American club promoter and convicted felon
 Michael Alison (1926–2004), British Conservative politician
 Michael Alldredge (1941–1997), American film and television actor
 Michael Ancram (born 1945), British politician
 Michael P. Anderson (1959–2003), United States Air Force officer and NASA astronaut
 Michael Andretti (born 1962), American auto racing driver
 Michael Angarano, American rapper
 Michael Ansara (1922–2013), American actor
 Michael Antonyuk (1935–1993), Ukraine-born Kazakhstani avant-garde artist
 Michael Archer (born 1974), American singer-songwriter, known by his stage name D'Angelo
 Michael Arbuthnot Ashcroft, British codebreaker
 Michael Arceneaux (born 1984), American writer
 Michael Arndt, American screenwriter
 Michael Arnold (born 1979), British novelist who writes historical fiction
 Michael Aronov (born 1976), American actor
 Michael Artin (born 1934), German-American mathematician
 Michael Aspel, English television presenter
 Michael Audley (1913–1995), American film and theatre director, actor, and dialogue advisor
 Mike Auret, Zimbabwean activist and politician
 Michael Avenatti, American attorney and criminal
 Michael Ball (disambiguation), several people
 Michael Bay, American filmmaker
 Michael Barbaro (born 1979), American journalist
 Michael Barnes (disambiguation), several people
 Michael Des Barres (born 1948), English actor and rock singer
 Michael Barrett (Fenian) (1841–1868), Irish murderer
 Michael Barrymore (born 1952), English actor and comedian
 Michael J. Bassett, filmmaker
 Michael Bate (born 1947), Canadian media entrepreneur
 Michael Bates, several people
 Michael Beach (born 1963), American actor
 Michael Bean, Canadian actor, author, acting coach
 Michael Beattie (actor), Canadian-American actor
 Michael Beattie (born 1960), Australian former professional rugby league footballer
 Michael Beauchamp (born 1981), Australian former professional footballer
 Michael Beavis (1929–2020), Royal Air Force officer
 Michael Been (1950–2010), American rock musician 
 Michael Behenna (born 1983), former United States Army First Lieutenant
 Michael Bennett (disambiguation), several people
 Michael Berk, American television screenwriter
 Michael Berkeley (born 1948), English composer, broadcaster on music and member of the House of Lords
 Michael Berryman (born 1948), American character actor
 Michael Zehaf-Bibeau (1982–2014), shooter who attacked the Canadian Parliament Buildings Centre Block
 Michael Biehn (born 1956), American actor
 Michael Bisping (born 1979), English sports analyst, actor, commentator and retired mixed martial artist
 Michael Ian Black, American comedian
 Michael Blackson, American-Ghanaian-Liberian actor and comedian
 Michael Blassie (1948–1972), United States Air Force officer
 Michael Bloomberg, American businessman and former mayor of New York City
 Michael Botticelli (born 1958), American public health official
 Michael Botticelli (figure skater) (1959–2023), American former figure skater
 Michael Bolton, American singer
 Michael Bowden (baseball), American baseball player
 Michael Ray Bower (born 1975), American actor
 Michael J. Bradshaw, British geographer
 Michael Bradley (disambiguation), several people
 Michael Brantley, American baseball player
 Michael Brdar, American baseball coach
 Michael Brecher (1925–2022), Canadian political scientist
 Michael Brecker (1949–2007), American jazz saxophonist and composer
 Michael Briere, Canadian criminal and murderer
 Michael Brooks (disambiguation), several people
 Michael Brown, multiple people
 Michael Broyde, American law professor
 Michael Bublé, Canadian singer
 Michael Buerk, British newsreader and journalist
 Michael Buffer, American boxing ring announcer
 Michael Bunting, Canadian ice hockey winger
 Michael Burleigh (born 1955), English author and historian
 Michael Burry (born 1971), American investor, hedge fund manager, and physician

C–F
 Michael T. Cahill, American law professor, Dean of Brooklyn Law School
 Michael Cain (born 1966), pianist and composer
 Michael Caine (disambiguation), several people
 Michael Capponi (born 1972), American businessman
 Michael Carbajal 5 time world champion boxer, and 1988 Olympic silver medalist
 Michael Carbonaro, American magician
 Michael Cashman (born 1950), British actor, politician, and LGBT rights activist
 Michael Cera (born 1988), Canadian actor and musician
 Michael Cerveris (born 1960), American actor, singer, and guitarist
 Michael Chambers (born 1967), American dancer and actor
 Michael Chandler (disambiguation), several people
 Michael Chang (born 1972), American former professional tennis player and coach
 Michael A. Chambers, former president of the Canadian Olympic Committee and senior partner at Maclaren Corlett LLP
 Michael Chambers (born 1967), American dancer and actor
 Michael Chabon (born 1963), American novelist, screenwriter, columnist and short story writer
 Michael Chan (disambiguation), several people
 Michael Chandler (disambiguation)
 Michael Chang, American tennis player and businessman
 Michael Charlton (born 1927), Australian-born Gold Logie winning former journalist and broadcaster
 Michael Chasen, American businessman
 Michael Chaturantabut, Thai/Chinese-American actor
 Michael Chaves, American filmmaker
 Michael Chavis, American baseball player
 Michael Checkland (born 1936), Director-General of the BBC from 1987 to 1992
 Michael Cheng, Canadian entrepreneur
 Michael Cheng (windsurfer) (born 1994), Hong Kong windsurfer
 Michael Cheung, known as MC (born 1996), Hong Kong singer and actor
 Michael Chisholm (born 1948), Canadian provincial politician
 Michael Chong (born 1971), Canadian politician
 Michael Christie (writer) (born 1976), Canadian writer
 Michael Cimino (born 1999), American actor
 Michael Claesson, Swedish officer
 Michael Clayton (golfer), Australian professional golfer
 Michael Clifford (disambiguation), several people
 Michael Coats (born 1946), former NASA astronaut
 Michael Coe (American football) (born 1983), former American football cornerback
 Michael D. Coe (1929–2019), American archaeologist, anthropologist, epigrapher, and author
 Michael Cohen (disambiguation), several people
 Michael Cole (disambiguation), several people
 Michael Coles (disambiguation), several people
 Michael Coletti, birth name of former Guns N' Roses drummer Steven Adler
 Michael Collins (disambiguation), several people
 Michael Connor, several people
 Michael Connors, several people
 Michael Constantine (1927–2021), American actor
 Michael Copeland (disambiguation), several people
 Michael Copon, American actor and producer
 Michael Shawn Crahan (known by his middle name), American musician
 Michael Crawford, English actor
 Michael Crichton, American writer and director
 Michael Cross, Chief of Staff of the Air Cadet Organization
 Michael Cross (painter) (fl. 1633–1660), Anglo-Spanish painter and copyist
 Michael Cuccione (1985–2001), Canadian child actor, singer, dancer, author, and cancer research activist
 Michael A. Cummings (born 1945), American artist and quilter
 Michael Curtiz (1886–1962), Hungarian-American film director
 Michael Daley (disambiguation), several people
 Michael Daly (disambiguation), several people
 Michael Ben David (born 1996), Israeli singer
 Michael Deiter, American football player
 Michael DeLorenzo (born 1959), Puerto Rican actor
 Michael DeLuise (born 1969), American actor, film director, and film producer
 Michael J. Devlin (born 1965), American convicted kidnapper
 Mike DeWine, American politician and attorney serving as the 70th governor of Ohio
 Michael Dingsdag (born 1982), Dutch former professional footballer who played as a central defender
 Michael Dinner (born 1953), American director, producer, and screenwriter for television
 Michael Divinity (born 1997), American football player
 Michael Dobson, several people
 Michael Dogbe, American football player
 Michael Dokes (1958–2012), American professional boxer
 Michael Donnellan (1915–1985), Irish-born London fashion designer
 Michael Dorn (born 1952), American actor
 Michael Douglas (disambiguation), several people
 Michael J. Dowling (politician) (1866–1921), Minnesota Republican politician
 Michael Drescher, American entrepreneur and philanthropist
 Michael Duhig (1953–2010), Canadian actor and radio host
 Michael Dulin, American pianist and composer
 Michael Dukakis, American politician
 Michael Dunahee (born 1986), Canadian missing person who was last seen in 1991
 Michael Clarke Duncan (1957–2012), American actor
 Michael Dunn (disambiguation), several people
 Michael Durrell (born 1943), American actor
 Michael Ealy (born 1973), American actor
 Michael Easton (born 1967), Irish-American television actor, writer, and director
 Michael Easton (composer) (1954–2004), British-Australian composer, musician, and music critic
 Michael Eisner, American businessman
 Michael Eitan (born 1944), Israeli politician
 Michael Epstein (disambiguation), several people
 Michael Erlewine, American musician
 Michael Ensign (born 1944), American actor
 Michael J. Estocin (1931–1967), United States Navy officer
 Michael Christopher Estes (born 1971), American terrorist
 Michael Fabricant (born 1950), British politician
 Michael Fainstat (1923–2010), Canadian politician and a City Councillor in Montreal, Quebec
 Michael Fanone, American law enforcement analyst and former police officer
 Michael Fansler (1883–1963), Justice of the Indiana Supreme Court
 Michael Faraday, English scientist
 Michael Farris (lawyer) (born 1951), American lawyer
 Michael Fassbender, Irish-German actor
 Michael Fay (disambiguation), several people
 Michael Federmann (born 1943), Israeli businessman and billionaire
 Michael Fekete (1886–1957), Hungarian-Israeli mathematician
 Michael Feliz (born 1993), Dominican baseball player
 Michael Fennelly (musician) (born 1949), American musician
 Michael Ferguson (1937–2021), British television director and producer
 Michael Findlay (filmmaker) (1937–1977), American filmmaker, producer and screenwriter
 Michael Finley (born 1973), American former professional basketball player
 Michael Finnegan (anthropologist), retired Professor of anthropology at Kansas State University
 Michael Fisher (disambiguation), several people
 Michael J. Fitzpatrick (diplomat), American diplomat who has served as the United States Ambassador to Ecuador since 2019
 Michael Patrick Flanagan (born 1962), captain in the United States Army, attorney, and politician from Chicago, Illinois
 Michael Gerald Ford (born 1950), son of US president Gerald Ford
 Michael Fraser (basketball) (born 1984), Canadian player
 Michael J. Fox (born 1961), Canadian-American retired actor, producer, and activist
 Michael Fuller (born 1959), British chief constable
 Michael Fulmer (born 1993), American baseball player

G–L
 Michael Gallagher (writer), American comic book writer
 Michael Gambon (born 1947), Irish-born British actor
 Michael Gandolfini (born 1999), American actor 
 Michael Gargiulo (born 1976), American convicted serial killer and rapist
 Michael Gargiulo (journalist) (born 1960), American television news anchor
 Michael Gaughan (businessman) (born 1943), American businessman, race car driver, race car owner and casino operator
 Michael Gaughan (Irish republican) (1949–1974), Irish republican who died on hunger strike in England
 Michael Gerard Tyson (born 1966), American boxer known as Mike Tyson, became the youngest heavyweight champion in history at the age of 20
 Michael Carl George (1958–1997), American murderer, kidnapper, child molester and possible serial killer
 Michael St. Gerard (born 1961), American former actor and pastor
 Michael Giacchino, American film composer
 Michael Gibbs (disambiguation), several people
 Michael Gilden (1962–2006), American actor
 Michael Giles (born 1942), English drummer, percussionist, and vocalist
 Michael Gillis (1949–2007), American academic and writer
 Michael Gläser (born 1957), German singer
 Michael Glaser (born 1943), American poet and educator
 Michael Gleason (musician), American musician, singer and songwriter
 Michael Goi (born 1959), American cinematographer and film director
 Michael A. Goorjian (born 1971), American actor, filmmaker, and writer
 Michael Gove (born 1967), British politician
 Michael Grais, American screenwriter
 Michael Greis (born 1976), former German biathlete
 Michael Grieve (1932–1995), Scottish journalist and political activist
 Michael Griffin (American football), American football player
 Michael Gross (disambiguation), several people
 Michael Gough (disambiguation), several people
 Michael Grove (born 1996), American baseball player
 Michael Gudinski (1952–2021), Australian entrepreneur, business executive, concert promoter and film producer
 Michael Guider (born 1950), Australian paedophile, serial child molester and manslaughterer
 Michael Gunter, professor of political science at Tennessee Technological University
 Michael Hamilton, several people
 Michael Halpin, Democratic member of the Illinois House of Representatives representing the 72nd district
 Michael Harris II (born 2001), American baseball player
 Michael Bambang Hartono (born 1939), Indonesian businessman
 Michael Harding (born 1953), Irish writer
 Michael Harding (soccer) (born 2001), American soccer player
 Michael Kieran Harvey (born 1961), Australian pianist and composer
 Michael Hastings (playwright) (1938–2011), British playwright, screenwriter, and occasional novelist and poet
 Michael Hayes (disambiguation), several people
 Michael Heidelberger (1888–1991), American immunologist
 Michael S. Heiser, American biblical Old Testament scholar and Christian author
 Michael Heizer (born 1944), American land artist
 Michael Hepburn (born 1991), Australian track and road cyclist
 Michael Hermosillo (born 1995), American baseball player
 Michael Hickson (died 2020), quadriplegic who died of COVID-19
 Michael Hogan (1896–1920) Gaelic Football captain, member of the Irish Volunteers, who is the namesake of Croke Park's 'Hogan Stand'
 Michael Lindsay-Hogg (born 1940), American-born television, film, music video, and theatre director
 Michael Holton, American basketball player and coach
 Michael Hopper (born 1969), Canadian Forces officer
 Michael Hrebeniak, British academic, author, filmmaker, journalist and ex-jazz musician
 Michael Conner Humphreys (born 1985), American actor
 Michael Hutchence, Australian musician
 Michael Hyatt, American actress
 Michael Ignatieff (born 1947), Canadian author, academic and former politician
 Michael Imperioli (born 1966), American actor, writer, and musician
 Michael Ironside (born 1950), Canadian actor
 Michael Irvin (born 1966), American sports commentator
 Michael Jacquet (born 1997), American football player
 Michael Jace (born 1962), American convicted murderer and former character actor
 Michael Jai White, American actor and martial artist
 Michael Jack (born 1946), Conservative Party politician
 Michael Jackson (disambiguation), several people
 Michael Jackson (1958–2009), American singer, songwriter and dancer
 Michael Jacobs (art and travel writer) (1952–2014), European writer
 Michael Jacobs (economist) (born 1960), English economist
 Michael Jacobs (producer) (born 1955), American television creator, writer, and producer
 Michael Jaffe (born 1945), American TV and film producer
 Michael Jaffé (1923–1997), British art historian and curator
 Michael James (born 1949), American artist, educator, author, and lecturer
 Michael Jeter, American actor
 Michael Johnson (disambiguation), several people
 Michael Jones, multiple people
 Michael Jordan (disambiguation), several people
 Michael Jordan (born 1963), American basketball player
 Michael B. Jordan (born 1987), American actor
 Michael Kahn (film editor) (born 1930), American film editor
 Michael Kahn (theatre director), American theatre director
 Michael Kamen (1948–2003), American composer
 Michael Karkoc (1919–2019), military officer
 Michael Katleman (born 1960), American film, television director and producer
 Michael Keaton, American actor
 Michael Kelly (disambiguation), several people
 Michael Kenworthy (born 1975), American actor
 Michael Keohane (athlete), American Paralympic athlete
 Keegan-Michael Key (born 1971), American actor, comedian, producer and screenwriter
 Michael (Khoroshy) (1885–1977), cleric of the Ukrainian Orthodox Church of Canada
 Michael Kim (pianist) (born 1968), Canadian concert pianist and professor
 Michael King (disambiguation), several people
 Michael J. L. Kirby (born 1941), former Canadian senator and current Chair of the Mental Health Commission of Canada
 Michael Kirby (judge) (born 1939), Justice of the High Court of Australia
 Michael Klim, Australian swimmer and world champion
 Michael Klinger, Australian first-class cricketer, who held the record for the most runs scored in the Big Bash League when he retired in 2019
 Michael Knight (disambiguation), several people
 Michael Koomen (1979–2011), Dutch amateur footballer
 Michael Kopech, American baseball player
 Michael Kors, American fashion designer
 Michael Kozoll, American screenwriter
 Michael Krassner (born 1971), American musician and composer
 Michael Krull (1925–1957), one half of a brothers' criminal duo from Pennsylvania
 Michael/Marvin Lee Aday, also known as Meat Loaf, (1948–2022), American singer and actor
 Michael Kutílek (1951–2017), one half of a Czech spree killers duo
 Michael Lamp (born 1977), Danish badminton player
 Michael Landon (1936–1991), American actor
 Michael Leahy (died 1826), Irish child who died by drowning
 Michael Learned, American actress
 Michael C. Lerner (born 1941), American actor
 Michael Lee (born 1964/1965), Canadian politician
 Michael Leib (1760–1822), American politician
 Michael Leitch, Japanese rugby union player
 Michael Lembeck (born 1948), American actor
 Michael-Leon Wooley, American theatre, film, television and voice actor
 Michael C. Lerner (born 1941), American actor
 Michael Leshner and Michael Stark (m. 2003), the first married gay couple in Canada
 Michael Lewis (disambiguation), several people
 Michael Ljunggren (1962–1995), Swedish organized crime figure
 Michael Lockwood, several people
 Michael Lohan (born 1960), American television personality, and father of actress Lindsay Lohan
 Michael F. Lohr (born 1952), 38th Judge Advocate General of the Navy
 Michael Lord (music), songwriter, composer, producer and Indie recording artist
 Michael Lorenzen, American baseball player

M–Q
 Michael MacMillan (born 1957), CEO of Blue Ant Media
 Michael Madhu, Indian film actor
 Michael Madhusudan Dutt, Indian poet and dramatist
 Michael Madison (born 1977), American convicted serial killer and sex offender
 Michael Maduell, American founder and president of the Sovereign Wealth Fund Institute
 Michael McGee (disambiguation), several people
 Michael Magee (disambiguation), several people
 Michael Malone (author) (1942–2022), American author and television writer
 Michael Maltese, American writer (Looney Tunes)
 Michael Mann (disambiguation), several people
 Michael Manning (disambiguation), several people
 Michael Mansfield (disambiguation), several people
 Michael Marmot, English professor
 Michael Mariano, Somali politician and businessman
 Michael Marquart, American music producer, drummer, and guitarist
 Michael Maschler (1927–2008), Israeli mathematician
 Michael Massey, American baseball player
 Michael Mastro (born 1925), American real estate developer
 Michael Mastro (actor) (born 1962), American Broadway and film actor
 Michael McCarron (born 1995), American professional ice hockey player
 Michael McCaul, (born 1962), American attorney and politician
 Michael McConnell (born 1942), one half of the first same-sex couple to be married legally with a license that was never revoked
 Michael McConnohie, American voice actor, writer and director
 Michael McDowell, American professional stock car racing driver
 Michael McFaul (born 1963), American academic and diplomat
 Michael J. McCulley (born 1943), American retired naval officer and aviator, test pilot
 Michael McCrea, British financial adviser and convicted killer
 Michael McDonald (disambiguation), multiple people
 Michael McDonald (musician) (born 1952), American musician (The Doobie Brothers)
 Michael McIntyre (born 1976), British comedian
 Michael McGrath (actor) (born 1957), American actor
 Michael Andrew McKagan, real name of Guns N' Roses bassist Duff McKagan
 Michael McKean (born 1947), American actor, comedian, screenwriter, composer, singer, and musician
 Michael Jones McKean (born 1976), American artist and educator
 Michael McLendon (born 1963), American politician and insurance producer
 Michael Joseph McNally (1860–1916), United States Marine Sergeant
 Michael McMahon (Scottish politician) (born 1961), former Scottish Labour Party politician
 Michael Meenaghan (died 1994), British forensic scientist
 Michael Michele, American actress
 Michael Milhoan (born 1957), American actor
 Michael Milken (born 1946), American convicted felon, financier and philanthropist
 Michael Mizanin (born 1980), American actor and professional wrestler
 Michael "Mike" Mohede (1983–2016), Indonesian singer
 Michael Monroe (born 1962), Finnish rock musician
 Michael Moore, American documentary filmmaker
 Michael Morpurgo (born 1943), English book author, poet, playwright, and librettist
 Michael G. Moye (born 1954), American photographer and a former television writer and producer
 Michael Mulgrew, fifth President of the United Federation of Teachers
 Michael "Mick" Mumford, career officer in the Australian Army
 Michael Munnelly (1941–1964), British murder victim
 Michael Myers (disambiguation), several people
 Mike Myers (born 1963), Canadian actor
 Michael Negrete (born 1981), American missing person
 Michael Nesmith, American musician
 Michael Nigg (1969–1995), American actor and murder victim
 Michael Nolan (disambiguation), several people
 Michael Norman (sprinter), American sprinter and Olympian, holds indoor 400m and US HS 400m records
 Michael Norton (skier) (1964–1996), Australian Paralympic alpine skier
 Michael F. Nozzolio (born 1951), American former New York State Senator
 Michael Nyman (born 1944), English composer of minimalist music, pianist, librettist, musicologist, and filmmaker
 Michael Ojemudia (born 1997), American football player
 Michael O'Keefe (disambiguation), multiple people
 Michael Olai, Finnish bishop
 Michael Ondaatje, Sri Lankan Canadian author and filmmaker
 Michael Onwenu (born 1997), American football player
 Michael O'Rourke (gambler), American fugitive and gambler
 Michael O'Sullivan (actor) (1934–1971), American actor
 Michael Owen, English footballer
 Michael Page (disambiguation), multiple people
 Michael Palin, British actor, comedian, writer and television presenter
 Michael Panes (born 1963), American actor, writer, musician and composer
 Michael Pangilinan, Filipino singer
 Michael Papajohn (born 1964), American character actor, stuntman and former college baseball player
 Michael Papierski, American baseball player
 Michael Paraskevas (born 1961), American illustrator, cartoonist, and animation producer
 Michael Parenti, American political scientist
 Michael Parker (disambiguation), multiple people
 Michael Parkinson, English broadcaster, journalist and author
 Michael Parsons (disambiguation), multiple people
 Michael "Mike" Pence, American politician, former Vice President of the United States
 Michael Penix Jr., American football player
 Michael Peoples, American baseball player
 Michael Peraza (born 1955), Cuban-American animator, art director, conceptual artist and historian of animation
 Michael Pérez, Puerto Rican baseball player
 Michael Pfaff (born 1973), American musician
 Michael Phelps, American Olympic swimmer
 Michael Pineda, Dominican baseball player
 Michael Pittman Jr. (born 1997), American football player
 Michael Plassmeyer, American baseball player
 Michael Player (1960–1986), American serial killer
 Michael Polanyi (1891–1976), Hungarian-British chemist, economist and philosopher
 Michael J. Pollard (1939–2019), American actor
 Michael Pompeo, American politician, Secretary of State of the US
 Michael Portillo (born 1953), British journalist, broadcaster and former politician
 Michael Potts (born 1962), American actor

R–Z
 Michael Radford (born 1946), English film director and screenwriter
 Michael Rady (born 1981), American actor
 Saravanan Michael Ramalingam (1971–1996), Singaporean murder victim
 Michael Randle (born 1933), English peace campaigner and researcher
 Michael Rapaport (born 1970), American actor and comedian
 Michael Rapino, Canadian-American business executive
 Michael Rapoport (born 1948), Austrian mathematician
 Michael Reaves (born 1950), American writer
 Michael Redgrave (1908–1985), English stage/film actor
 Michael Redlicki, American tennis player
 Michael Reeves (1943–1969), English film director and screenwriter
 Michael Reeves (YouTuber), American YouTuber and Twitch streamer
 Michael Regan (disambiguation), several people
 Michael Registe (born 1982), American criminal
 Michael Eric Reid, American actor
 Michael Reisser (1946–1988), Israeli politician
 Michael Rennie (1909–1971), British film, television and stage actor
 Michael Trent Reznor (known by his middle name), American musician
 Michael Rice (disambiguation), several people
 Michael Wayne Richard (1959–2007), American murder and rapist
 Michael Richards (disambiguation), several people
 Michael Robison (born 1955), Canadian film and television director
 Michael Rockefeller (1938–1961?), son of U.S. Vice President Nelson Rockefeller
 Michael Roll (basketball), American-Tunisian basketball player
 Michael Rooker, American actor
 Michael Rosen (born 1946), British writer
 Michael Rosenbaum, American actor
 Michael Rosenblum (disappeared 1980), American missing person who is now known to have died
 Michael Ross, multiple people
 Michael Roth (disambiguation), several people
 Michael Rubbo (born 1938), Australian filmmaker, screenwriter, and publisher
 Michael Rubin (disambiguation), several people
 Michael Rucker (disambiguation), several people
 Michael Ruse (born 1940), British-born Canadian philosopher of science
 Michael Sarrazin (1940–2011), Canadian actor
 Michael Saunders, Canadian professional baseball player
 Michael Schermick (born 1958), American guitarist 
 Michael Schumacher, German racing driver
 Michael Schur (born c. 1975/1976), American television producer, writer, and character actor
 Michael Scot (c. 1175–1232), Scottish astrologer
 Michael Seater (born 1987), Canadian actor, director, screenwriter, and producer
 Michael Sela, Israeli immunologist
 Michael Sessions (born 1987), American former mayor of Hillsdale, Michigan
 Michael Shane (1927–1994), American lawyer and actor
 Michael Shanks (disambiguation), several people
 Michael Eugene Sharp (1954–1997), American serial killer 
 Michael William Sharp (1776?–1840), English painter
 Michael Sharpe, several people
 Michael Sheen (born 1969), Welsh actor, television producer and political activist
 Michael Shermer (born 1954), American science writer, and historian of science
 Michael Singh (1945–2005), Trinidad and Tobago-born American serial killer
 Michael Silka (1958–1984), American spree killer
 Michael Silver, multiple people
 Michael Silverstein (1945–2020), American linguist
 Michael Slobodian (died 1975), Canadian murderer
 Michael Smith (disambiguation), several people
 Michael Sorvino (born 1977), American actor and producer
 Michael Spavor (born 1976), Canadian consultant
 Michael Spilotro (1944–1986), American murder victim
 Michael Spöttel, German runner
 Michael Sylvester Gardenzio Stallone, birth name of American actor and film director Sylvester Stallone
 Michael Stanley (disambiguation), several people
 Michael Steel, multiple people
 Michael Steele (musician), American bassist for The Bangles
 Michael Stefanic, American baseball player
 Michael Stevens (educator), American YouTuber and educator, AKA VSauce
 Michael Stich (born 1968), former professional tennis player from Germany
 Michael Stich (director), American television soap opera director
 Michael Stillman (born 1957), American mathematician
 Michael Stipe, American singer/lyricist for R.E.M.
 Michael Stoyanov (born 1970), American actor
 J. Michael Straczynski (born 1954), American filmmaker and comic book writer
 Michael Strahan, American television personality and former footballer
 Michael Straight (1916–2004), American magazine publisher, novelist, and patron of the arts
 Michael Stuart (physician), American sports physician and orthopedic surgeon
 Michael Suen (born 1944), Acting Chief Secretary for Administration in 2005 and 2012
 Michael Sumpter (1947–2001), American serial killer and rapist
 Michael Swango (born 1954), American serial killer and former physician
 Michael Sym (died 1577), Scottish goldsmith
 Michael A. Taylor, American baseball player
 Michael Joseph Teutul (born 1978), American television personality
 Michael Thevis (1932–2013), Greek American millionaire pornographer and convicted murderer
 Michael Thivaios, Belgian-Greek DJ also known by his stage name Like Mike
 Michael Thwaites (1915–2005), Australian academic, poet, and intelligence officer
 Michael Toglia, American baseball player
 Michael Tolkin (born 1950), American filmmaker and novelist
 Michael Roy Toney (1965–2009), American charged and wrongfully convicted in 1999 for a bombing
 Michael Traynor (actor), American actor
 Michael Tree (1934–2018), American violist
 Michael Trucco (born 1970), American actor
 Michel Trudeau (1975–1998), youngest son of Canadian Prime Minister Pierre Trudeau and Margaret Trudeau, younger brother of current Prime Minister Justin Trudeau
 Michael Tsur, Israeli attorney, negotiator, mediator, and academic
 Michael E. Uslan (born 1951), American lawyer and film producer
 Michael V. (born 1969), Filipino actor and comedian
 Michael Venus (entertainer), Canadian artist, actor and producer
 Michael Verhoeven (born 1938), German film director
 Michael Vick, American football player
 Michael Vosse (1941–2014), American journalist and A&M Records publicist
 Michael Vlamis (born 1990), American actor, screenwriter, director, and producer
 Michael Wacha (born 1991), American baseball player
 Michael Wachter, American professor
 Michael Waldron, American screenwriter and producer
 Michael Walker (disambiguation), several people
 Michael Warren (actor), American actor and basketball player
 Michael Warren II (born 1997), American football player
 Michael Watson (disambiguation), multiple people
 Michael Barret Watson (born 1974), known professionally as Barry Watson, American actor
 Michael Weatherly (born 1968), American actor, producer, director, and musician
 Michael Weir (murderer) (born 1966), British double murderer
 Michael Weisskopf (born 1946), Polk Award-winning journalist
 Michael Wendler, German singer
 Michael Wilbon, American sportswriter
 Michael Wincott (born 1958), Canadian actor
 Michael Winslow (born 1958), American actor, comedian, and beatboxer
 Michael Wong (singer), Malaysian singer based in Taiwan
 Michael J. Woodard (born 1997), American singer and actor
 Michael Yarmush (born 1982), American actor
 Michael "Mike" Yarwood, English impressionist, comedian and actor
 Michael York (disambiguation), several people
 Michael Young, several people
 Michael Zager (born 1943), American record producer, composer, and arranger of original music
 Michael Zaslow (1942–1998), American actor
 Michael Zelniker, Canadian actor, director, and screenwriter
 Michael Zohary (1898–1983), Israeli botanist

Fictional characters 
 Michael, a character played by Christian Tessier in the 2020 movie Welcome to the Circle
 Michael, a character in Barney and the Backyard Gang and Barney & Friends
 Michael, a character in the 2005 American romantic comedy movie Adam & Steve
 Michael, the main character in the 1990 American animated drug-abuse prevention television special Cartoon All-Stars to the Rescue
 Michael, the immortal afterlife architect from The Good Place
 Michael Afton, a major recurring character in the survival horror video game series Five Nights at Freddy's
 Michael Anthony, a recurring fictional character in the American television series The Millionaire
 Michael Banks, a character from the Mary Poppins and its franchise
 Michael Barret, a character from the 2008 short comedy Zoey 101: Behind the Scenes
 Michael Baxter, a character from the TV series Last Man Standing
 Michael "Mickey" Bunce, from 1991 black comedy movie Drop Dead Fred
 Michael Bleuth, a character and protagonist from the American TV sitcom Arrested Development
 Michael Bower, a recurring character in the American sitcom television series Who's the Boss?
 Michael "Mike" Brody, a character from the 1983 film Jaws 3-D
 Michael Burnham, from Star Trek: Discovery 
 Michael "Mike" Robert Chang, Jr, a character from the American musical comedy drama TV series Glee
 Michael Corleone, from The Godfather
 Michael Culhane, a character from the 1981 American prime time television soap opera Dynasty
 Michael Darling, one of the Darling children and the main character in the 1953 Walt Disney's animated film Peter Pan
 Michael Dawson, from the American TV series Lost
 Michael "Crocodile" Dundee, the main character and protagonist from the Crocodile Dundee film series
 Michael "Tum-Tum" Douglas, a character in the 1992 American martial arts comedy movie 3 Ninjas
 Michael De Santa, one of the three main protagonists in the 2013 video game Grand Theft Auto V
 Michael "Tank" Ellis, in the Canadian-American science fiction-action television series Captain Power and the Soldiers of the Future
 Michael Emerson, a character from the TV series The Lost Boys
 Michael Guerin, one of the four main protagonists of the American TV series Roswell as well as the rebooted series Roswell, New Mexico
 Michael Hamilton, character in The Cloverfield Paradox
 Michael "Mike" Hanlon, a character from the 1986 novel IT and its adaptions
 Michael Harper, in the British sitcom My Family
 Michael Hayes, the main character in the self titled American television drama series
 Mike Heck, from the TV series The Middle
 Michael Hogan, in the American sitcom television series The Hogan Family
 Michael Hunsaker, in the 1987 American buddy cop action movie Lethal Weapon
 Michael Kelso, a character from the American TV series That '70s show
 Michael Kitz, a character in the 1997 American science fiction drama movie Contact
 Michael Knight, originally Michael Long, from American TV series Knight Rider
 Michael Lee, character on the HBO drama The Wire
 Michael Mallory, a character from the television series Sliders
 Michael McBain, character from the ABC soap opera One Life to Live
 Michael McDonnell, a character in the 1998 slasher movie Urban Legend
 Father Michael McKinnon, a character in the 1998 American drama movie The Proposition
 Michael Moon, character from the BBC soap opera EastEnders
 Michael Myers, from the Halloween franchise
 Michael 'Squints' Palledorous, a character from the 1993 film The Sandlot
 Michael Ross, fictional character from the television series Home and Away
 Michael Ross, a character from the TV series Suits
 Michael Scofield, one of the two main protagonists of the American TV series Prison Break
 Michael Scott, from American TV series The Office
 Michael Shayne, private detective character created during the late 1930s by writer Brett Halliday
 Michael Spence, character from the BBC medical drama Holby City
 Michael Taylor, a character in the American television sitcom My Two Dads
 Michael "Mike" Wazowski, a character from the animated Monsters, Inc. film franchise
 Michael "Mike" Wheeler, a character from the Netflix Sci-fi drama series Stranger Things
 Michael Yagoobian, a character from the 2007 animated film Meet the Robinsons

See also
 Michael (disambiguation)
 Mick, includes list of people named Mick
 Mike, includes list of people named Mike
 Mychal, includes list of people named Mychal
 Micheal, includes list of people named Micheal
 List of people with given name Mikhail

Michael